Tepi may refer to:

 Tepi, Ethiopia, a town in Ethiopia
 Tepi, Georgia, a village in Georgia
 Tepi Länsivuori (born 1945), Finnish motorcycle road racer
 Tepi Moilanen (born 1973), Finnish football player

See also 
 Tepe (disambiguation)
 Tipi (disambiguation)